Charlie Dalin (born 10 May 1984 in le Havre) is a French offshore sailor. He placed second in the quadrennial Vendée Globe race around the world that took place in 2020–2021, with a time of 80 days, 6 hours, 15 minutes and 47 seconds. He has a Naval Architecture degree from the University of Southampton.

Sailing Highlights

References

External links
 
 
 Campaign Website

1984 births
Living people
Sportspeople from Le Havre
Alumni of the University of Southampton
French male sailors (sport)
IMOCA 60 class sailors
French Vendee Globe sailors
2020 Vendee Globe sailors
Vendée Globe finishers
Single-handed circumnavigating sailors